Hodgson is a rural town and locality in the Maranoa Region, Queensland, Australia.

Geography 
The Warrego Highway and the Western Railway Line both run along the southern boundary of the locality. The locality is served by Hodgson railway station.

The town is situated in roughly the centre of the locality. North Hodgson is a neighbourhood north of the town.

The land use is mostly grazing on native vegetation with some crop growing.

History 
The town was named after pastoralist and politician Arthur Hodgson.

Hodgson Provisional School opened on 1 February 1876. On 1 September 1884, it became Hodgson State School. It closed in 1964.

Hodgson Soldier's Memorial Hall was officially opened on Saturday 21 May 1949. It was erected in memory of Hodgson residents who had died in military service during World War I and World War II. Between 350 and 400 people attended the opening.

Hodgson Community Church opened on Sunday 31 July 1949. As Hodgson had never had a church, the community led by Mrs Knowles raised funds to build a church which could be used by any religious denomination. It was in Hodgson Lane North. Circa 1990, the church was relocated to be used as a hall at the rear of the Salvation Army church in Roma.

Education 
There are no schools in the locality. The nearest primary and secondary school is Roma State College in Roma to the east and Mitchell State School in Mitchell to the west.

Amenities 
Hodgson Soldiers Memorial Hall is in Ernest Street.

Hodgson Monumental Cemetery is in Hopewell Lane.

References

External links 

 

Towns in Queensland
Maranoa Region
Localities in Queensland